Justine-Juliette Lévy (born 27 September 1974) is a French book editor and author.

Life and career
Lévy is the eldest daughter of Isabelle Doutreluigne and French philosopher, writer, and media personality, Bernard-Henri Lévy. Her 1995 debut novel "Le Rendez-vous" (The Rendezvous) was translated from French into English and published in the United States in 1997.

On 21 September 1996 she married Raphaël Enthoven, the son of her father's best friend, Jean-Paul Enthoven, who left her in 2000 for model and singer, Carla Bruni (at the time his father's girlfriend and who is now married to former French President Nicolas Sarkozy). She wrote a novel whose story paralleled her own life. The 2004 book was released in France under the title "Rien de Grave" (published in English in 2005 as Nothing Serious). The winner of the first Prix Littéraire Le Vaudeville, her book knocked The Da Vinci Code from Europe's bestseller lists. It was published in the United States in October 2005.

Justine has two children with actor and director Patrick Mille. She describes her relationship with Patrick as "not married, but like married". Like Nothing Serious protagonist Louise, Justine is also a little cynical about monogamy. Justine married Patrick on March 11, 2023 at the Parisian 6th arrondissement's town hall after 22 years together.

Books 
1997: Le rendez-vous (The Rendezvous) - Scribner, awarded the Prix Contrepoint in 1996
2005: Rien de grave (Nothing Serious) - Melville House Publishing, 
2009: Mauvaise fille (Bad Girl) - Stock ,  (Adapted in the movie of the same name)
2014: La gaieté (Happiness) - Stock,
2019: Histoires de familles (Family History) - with The Anonymous Project - Flammarion,
2021: Son fils (Her Son) - Stock,

References

1974 births
Living people
20th-century French novelists
21st-century French novelists
French people of Algerian-Jewish descent
Jewish French writers
Print editors
Writers from Paris